Magdalensee is a small lake east of the Carinthian city of Villach, Austria.

Lakes of Carinthia (state)